Blackwater is a 1993 novel by the Swedish writer Kerstin Ekman. It received the August Prize in 1993 and the Nordic Council Literature Prize in 1994. It also won the Best Swedish Crime Novel Award.

See also
 1993 in literature
 Swedish literature

References

1993 Swedish novels
Novels set in Sweden
Swedish crime novels
Albert Bonniers Förlag books
August Prize-winning works
Nordic Council's Literature Prize-winning works
Swedish-language novels